Brama Portowa I is an A-class office building located in the quarter bounded by Niepodległości Avenue, Wyszyński Street and Tkacka Street, in the Old Town, in the Śródmieście district. Brama Portowa I earned a LEED Gold certification.

History 
Between 1970 and 2007 the site of the current office building occupied the "Grzybek" traffic control building. After the demolition of "Grzybek", in 2008 the site became the property of Inter IKEA Centre Polska. The new owner commenced construction works in January 2011. The building was completed in August 2012.

At the end of January 2021 the Brama Portowa I office building together with the neighbouring Brama Portowa II was sold to the Austrian fund FLE SICAV FIS.

References 

Office buildings in Szczecin
Office buildings completed in 2012
Old Town, Szczecin